Sphaerocoryphe is a genus of trilobite that lived from the middle Ordovician to the Silurian. Its fossils have been found in Australia, Europe, and North America. Both Sphaerocoryphe and Hemisphaerocoryphe had a characteristically bulbous glabella, and the two may represent only one genus.

References

External links
Sphaerocoryphe in the Paleobiology Database

Cheiruridae
Phacopida genera
Ordovician trilobites
Silurian trilobites
Trilobites of Europe
Trilobites of North America
Trilobites of Oceania
Middle Ordovician first appearances
Silurian extinctions
Bromide Formation
Paleozoic life of the Northwest Territories
Paleozoic life of Quebec